HaSheker HaGadol is a 2012 Israeli social drama film directed by Yamin Messika and Yarmi Kadoshi, owners of Hamizrah Productions. The film stars Liat Banai, Shirley Ben-David, Yankele Ben Sira, footballer Eran Levy, Beber Yoko, with a cameo from Yaron London as himself.

References

2012 films
Israeli drama films